No Wonder is the second studio album from Will Stratton.

Critical reception

The album received generally favorable reviews. PopMatters cited a further advancement in writing and composition as "stronger, meatier, and much braver" than What the Night Said, but noted that some of the forays into pop-rock territory (specifically "Nineteen" and "It's OK If You Want To") were distracting from the overall flow of the record.

Track listing
 "Who Will" - 3:00
 "For Franny Glass" – 3:01
 "The Country Clear" – 3:17
 "The Past Always Runs Faster" – 3:25
 "Robin and Marian" – 6:07
 "For No One" – 2:58
 "Nineteen" – 4:05
 "Your California Sky" – 2:42
 "You're a Real Thing" – 3:13
 "No Wonder" – 3:56
 "It's Ok If You Want To" – 4:48
 "If Only" – 2:05
 "Judas, 1966" - 4:16
 "New Jersey" - 4:04

Song notes
 The title track of this album was NPR's song of the day on March 26, 2010.

References

2009 albums
Will Stratton albums